The Women's Downhill competition in the 2005 FIS Alpine Skiing World Cup involved eight events, including the World Cup season finals in Lenzerheide, Switzerland.  In the finals, generally only the top 25 racers in the discipline (along with skiers having more than 500 points overall and the world juniors champion in the discipline) are eligible to compete, and only the top 15 finishers receive points.

Defending discipline champion Renate Götschl of Austria entered the finals with a 32-point lead over Germany's Hilde Gerg and then clinched her fourth championship in this discipline by winning the finals race, as Gerg finished third.

The season was interrupted by the 2005 World Ski Championships, which were held from 28 January to 13 February in Bormio, Italy. The women's downhill was held on 6 February.

Standings

DNF = Did Not Finish
DSQ = Disqualified
DNS = Did Not Start
NE = Not Eligible for finals

See also
 2005 Alpine Skiing World Cup – Women's summary rankings
 2005 Alpine Skiing World Cup – Women's Overall
 2005 Alpine Skiing World Cup – Women's Super-G
 2005 Alpine Skiing World Cup – Women's Giant Slalom
 2005 Alpine Skiing World Cup – Women's Slalom
 2005 Alpine Skiing World Cup – Women's Combined

References

External links
 

FIS Alpine Ski World Cup women's downhill discipline titles